Eneo Bitri (born 26 August 1996) is an Albanian footballer playing for FC Baník Ostrava in the Czech First League in Czech Republic.

Career

Club
On 25 June 2021, FC Astana announced the signing of Bitri. On 2 January 2022, Astana announced that Bitri had left the club by mutual consent.

Career statistics

Club

References

External links

1996 births
Living people
Sportspeople from Berat
Albanian footballers
FK Tomori Berat players
FK Partizani Tirana players
FC Kamza players
FC Astana players
Kategoria Superiore players
Kazakhstan Premier League players
Expatriate footballers in Kazakhstan
Albanian expatriate sportspeople in Kazakhstan
Association football central defenders
Albania international footballers
FC Baník Ostrava players
Albanian expatriate sportspeople in the Czech Republic
Expatriate footballers in the Czech Republic